The 23rd annual Webby Awards were held at Cipriani Wall Street in New York City on May 13, 2019, and hosted by actress Jenny Slate. The Webby Awards have been dubbed the "internet's highest honor".

The nominees were announced on April 2, 2019 and voting was open to the public. The winners were announced on April 23. Winners include Disney, which won Webby's 'Media Company of the Year', Hasan Minhaj, who won the 'Webby Special Achievement' award, and web series 'Fake News Writer', which won the Webby in Video Entertainment.

Winners

(from http://webbyawards.com/winners/2019/)

References

External links
Official site

2019
2019 awards in the United States
2019 in New York City
May 2019 events in the United States
2019 in Internet culture